Howell County is in southern Missouri. As of the 2020 census, the population was 39,750. The largest city and county seat is West Plains. The county was officially organized on March 2, 1851, and is named after Josiah Howell, a pioneer settler in the Howell Valley.

Howell County comprises the West Plains, MO, Micropolitan Statistical Area.

History

Howell County was organized on March 2, 1857, from Oregon County, and is named for Josiah Howell, who made the first settlement in Howell Valley.

The first circuit court met in a log cabin one mile east of West Plains, according to an 1876 account. A small, wooden courthouse was built on the square in West Plains in 1859. It was damaged during the Civil War in 1862. The county was reorganized three years later, but all of the county records were destroyed in an 1866 fire. A second courthouse was built in West Plains in 1869. It was a small, three-room, frame building, about 24 by 30 feet.

Geography
It is the third-largest county in Missouri by land area and fourth-largest by total area.

Adjacent counties
Texas County (north)
Shannon County (northeast)
Oregon County (east)
Fulton County, Arkansas (south)
Ozark County (southwest)
Douglas County (northwest)

Major highways
 U.S. Route 60
 U.S. Route 63
 U.S. Route 160
 Route 14
 Route 17
 Route 76
 Route 142

National protected area
Mark Twain National Forest (part)

Demographics

As of the census of 2000, there were 37,238 people, 14,762 households, and 10,613 families residing in the county. The population density was 40 people per square mile (16/km2). There were 16,340 housing units at an average density of 18 per square mile (7/km2). The racial makeup of the county was 96.41% White, 0.31% Black or African American, 0.97% Native American, 0.36% Asian, 0.04% Pacific Islander, 0.28% from other races, and 1.63% from two or more races. Approximately 1.21% of the population were Hispanic or Latino of any race. Among the major first ancestries reported in Howell County were 28.3% American, 16.4% German, 12.2% Irish, and 12.1% English.

There were 14,762 households, out of which 32.7% had children under the age of 18 living with them, 58.8% were married couples living together, 9.9% had a female householder with no husband present, and 28.10% were non-families. 25.0% of all households were made up of individuals, and 12.3% had someone living alone who was 65 years of age or older. The average household size was 2.47 and the average family size was 2.94.

In the county, the population consisted of 26.0% under the age of 18, 7.8% from 18 to 24, 26.2% from 25 to 44, 23.30% from 45 to 64, and 16.8% who were 65 years of age or older. The median age was 38 years. For every 100 females there were 93.6 males. For every 100 females age 18 and over, there were 88.5 males.

The median income for a household in the county was $31,761, and the median income for a family was $38,047. Males had a median income of $22,960 versus $16,968 for females. The per capita income for the county was $17,184. About 14.00% of families and 18.7% of the population were below the poverty line, including 26.3% of those under age 18 and 14.0% of those age 65 or over.

Religion
According to the Association of Religion Data Archives County Membership Report (2000), Howell County is a part of the Bible Belt with evangelical Protestantism being the majority religion. The most predominant denominations among residents in Howell County who adhere to a religion are Southern Baptists (47.70%), Churches of Christ (8.81%), and Roman Catholics (6.99%).

2020 Census

Education
Of adults 25 years of age and older in Howell County, 73.4% possesses a high school diploma or higher while 10.9% holds a bachelor's degree or higher as their highest educational attainment.

Public schools
Mountain View-Birch Tree R-III School District - Mountain View
Birch Tree Elementary School - Birch Tree - (PK-06) - Located in Shannon County
Mountain View Elementary School - (PK-06)
Liberty Middle School - (07-08)
Liberty High School - (09-12)
West Plains R-VII School District - West Plains
South Fork Elementary School (K-06)
West Plains Elementary School (K-04)
West Plains Middle School (05-08)
West Plains High School (09-12)
Willow Springs R-IV School District - Willow Springs
Willow Springs Elementary School (PK-04)
Willow Springs Middle School (05-08)
Willow Springs High School (09-12)
Fairview R-XI School District - West Plains
Fairview Elementary School (K-08)
Glenwood R-VIII School District - West Plains
Glenwood Elementary School - (PK-08)
Howell Valley R-I School District - West Plains
Howell Valley Elementary School (K-08)
Junction Hill C-12 School District - West Plains
Junction Hill Elementary School - (K-08)
Richards R-V School District - West Plains
Richards Elementary School - (K-08)

Private schools
Faith Assembly Christian School - West Plains - (PK-12) - Assemblies of God/Pentecostal
Ozarks Christian Academy - West Plains - (K-10) - non denominational/Protestant - Classical Christian Education
Trinity Christian Academy - Mountain View - (K-12) - Pentecostal - Wade St., Mountain View.

Alternative and vocational schools
Ozark Horizon State School - West Plains - (K-12) - A school for handicapped students and those with other special needs.
South Central Career Center - West Plains - (09-12) - Vocational/technical

Colleges and universities
Missouri State University-West Plains - A satellite campus of Missouri State University

Public libraries
Mountain View Public Library  
West Plains Public Library  
Willow Springs Public Library

Politics

Local

The Republican Party predominantly controls politics at the local level in Howell County. Republicans hold all elected positions in the county. District 2 (Southern) Commissioner Billy Sexton took office as a Democrat but announced in 2014 he was changing parties and sought re-election as a Republican.

State

In the Missouri House of Representatives, Howell County is divided into two legislative districts, both of which are represented by Republicans.

 District 154 — Shawn Rhoads (R-West Plains. Consists of most of the entire county.

District 142 — Robert Ross (R-Yukon). Consists of the city of Mountain View.

All of Howell County is a part of Missouri's 33rd District in the Missouri Senate and is currently represented by Mike Cunningham of Rogersville.

Federal
Missouri's two U.S. Senators are Claire McCaskill of Kirkwood and Roy Blunt of Strafford.

All of Howell County is included in Missouri's 8th Congressional District and is currently represented by Jason T. Smith of Salem in the U.S. House of Representatives. Smith won a special election on Tuesday, June 4, 2013, to complete the remaining term of former U.S. Representative Jo Ann Emerson of Cape Girardeau. Emerson announced her resignation a month after being reelected with over 70 percent of the vote in the district. She resigned to become CEO of the National Rural Electric Cooperative.

Political culture

Howell County is, like several rural counties located in the Ozarks, conservative and strongly Republican at the presidential level. Bill Clinton of neighboring Arkansas was the last Democratic presidential nominee to win Howell County in 1992; he lost the county during his 1996 reelection bid and since then, voters in Howell County have decisively backed Republicans. Controversy occurred during the course of the 2008 presidential campaign over a billboard displayed near West Plains that depicted a picture of then-Democratic presidential nominee Barack Obama in a turban. Some were offended by the billboard and deemed it racist.

Like most rural areas throughout Southeast Missouri, voters in Howell County generally adhere to socially and culturally conservative principles which tend to influence their Republican leanings. In 2004, Missourians voted on a constitutional amendment to define marriage as the union between a man and a woman—it overwhelmingly won in Howell County with 83.36 percent of the vote. The initiative passed the state with 71 percent of support from voters. In 2006, Missourians voted on a constitutional amendment to fund and legalize embryonic stem cell research in the state—it failed in Howell County with 57.97 percent voting against the measure. The initiative narrowly passed the state with 51 percent of support from voters as Missouri became one of the first states in the nation to approve embryonic stem cell research. Despite Howell County's longstanding tradition of supporting socially conservative platforms, voters in the county have a penchant for advancing populist causes like increasing the minimum wage. In 2006, Missourians voted on a proposition (Proposition B) to increase the minimum wage in the state to $6.50 an hour—it passed Howell County with 67.79 percent of the vote. The proposition strongly passed every single county in Missouri with 78.99 percent voting in favor. (During the same election, voters in five other states also strongly approved increases in the minimum wage.)

Missouri presidential preference primary (2008)

In the 2008 Missouri Presidential Primary, voters in Howell County from both political parties supported candidates who finished in second place in the state at large and nationally. Former Governor Mike Huckabee (R-Arkansas) received more votes, a total of 2,882, than any candidate from either party in Howell County during the 2008 Missouri Presidential Preference Primary.

Communities

Cities
Brandsville
Mountain View
West Plains (county seat)
Willow Springs

Census-designated places
Pomona
South Fork

Other unincorporated places

 Amy
 Arditta
 Burnham
 Caulfield
 Chapel
 Chapin
 China
 Cottbus
 Crider
 Cull
 Cureall
 Egypt Grove
 Fanchon
 Frankville
 Fruitville
 Grimmet
 Horton
 Hocomo
 Hutton Valley
 Lanton
 Lebo
 Leota
 Moody
 Olden
 Peace Valley
 Pottersville
 Siloam Springs
 Sterling
 Trask

Townships

 Benton
 Chapel
 Dry Creek
 Goldsberry
 Howell
 Hutton Valley
 Myatt
 Siloam Springs
 Sisson
 South Fork
 Spring Creek
 Willow Springs

See also
National Register of Historic Places listings in Howell County, Missouri

References

External links
Howell County, Missouri
Howell County Courthouse, MU Extension
 Digitized 1930 Plat Book of Howell County  from University of Missouri Division of Special Collections, Archives, and Rare Books

 
1857 establishments in Missouri
Populated places established in 1857